Wickford station may refer to: 
Wickford railway station in Essex, England
Wickford Junction station in Rhode Island, United States